Gunapati Venkata Krishna Reddy (born 22 March 1937) is a philanthropist and entrepreneur. GVK Reddy is the founder and chairman of GVK Group, a business conglomerate with a predominant focus on infrastructure development.

GVK Reddy also heads GVK EMRI, Corporate social responsibility initiatives of GVK. This is an emergency response services provider under a Public-Private Partnership model spread across 15 states and two Union Territories of India. In 2009, he was elected as the Chairman of 108 Ambulance for Andhra Pradesh.

As the President of the All India Senior Tennis Association and a tennis player himself, GVK Reddy has been a keen supporter of budding sporting talent. He has led GVK Group to sponsor many young tennis players including Sania Mirza and Pranjala Yadlapalli.

Early life and education
GVK Reddy was born on 22 March 1937 in Kothur Village of Nellore District in Andhra Pradesh. Reddy did his basic schooling from his village, early college from Nellore and graduated from Hyderabad.  He later completed the Owner/President Management (OPM) Program from Harvard Business School, USA. GV Krishna Reddy is married to Indira Reddy, and has a daughter, Shalini Bhupal, and a son GV Sanjay Reddy.

Career
GVK Reddy began his career at the age of 21 by taking over his family construction business. The starting business was contracting major irrigation projects including bridges, dams, and irrigation canals. His first project included construction of canal and under tunnel at Nagarjuna Sagar Right Canal at Adigoppula and Chamarajapuram. Apart from Airports, Roads & Power, GVK has a presence in Hospitality and Life-Sciences sectors.

One of the milestone achievements for GVK Reddy was winning the Jegurupadu power project in Andhra Pradesh for GVK Group in 1990. This helped the business scale up, form international collaborations and win national recognition in its upcoming projects. Before Jegurupadu power project, he had also led to group to hospitality projects in Hyderabad.

Philanthropy 
The philanthropic focus of GVK Reddy is driven by the GVK Foundation which formed to serve the underprivileged. The various endeavors of this foundation now extends to urban improvement initiatives and promoting sports talent.

Under his leadership GVK Group has focused on environment preservation with the setting up of Deer Park which is spread over 6 hectares at the Jegurupada Power Plant and Botanical Gardens in Mumbai. The group has also adapted environment friendly practices in its constructed plants such as Jegurupada Power Plant, Goindwal Sahib Thermal Power Project, Punjab and waste management in airports.

GVK-EMRI's hospital offered free covid treatment after becoming operational on June 7, 2021. GVK Reddy contributed Rs 1 crore for the construction of Ram Mandir.

Awards and honours

 Felicitated by the Turf Authorities of India (TAI) for the lead role played by GVK in India's infrastructure development at the TAI Awards 2019.
 ‘Lifetime Achievement Award’ at the ‘Realty Plus Conclave & Excellence Awards- South 2017’.
 “Lifetime Achievement Award” at the Construction Times Annual Awards, 2017. 
 “Lifetime Achievement Award” at the Construction Week India Annual Awards, 2017.
 “Lifetime Achievement Award” at the 6th EPC World Awards, 2017 for a contribution toward infrastructure and construction sectors.     
'Padma Bhushan' award in 2011 by then President Pratibha Patil and Prime Minister Manmohan Singh.
'Entrepreneur of the year' at ET Awards in 2008–09.

See also
GVK (conglomerate)

References 

People from Nellore district
Businesspeople from Andhra Pradesh
Indian billionaires
Living people
Telugu people
Osmania University alumni
1937 births
Recipients of the Padma Bhushan in trade and industry
GVK Group